North District is an urban district in the Taiwanese city of Taichung. It was a part of Taichung before the City and County were amalgamated in 2010. The North District is one of Taichung's major developed shopping, education, and cultural areas.

History
The district was a part of Taichung  provincial city before the merger with Taichung County to form Taichung special municipality on 25 December 2010.

Administrative divisions
Zhongzheng, Liuge, Guangda, Wenzhuang, Dahu, Wuchang, Jinping, Xinbei, Xinxing, Leying, Jincun, Jiancheng, Jiande, Jinzhou, Jinxiang, Jinhua, Jinlong, Qiucuo, Jianxing, Dingcuo, Chongde, Laicuo, Laifu, Laixing, Laiwang, Laiming, Meichuan, Laicun, Yude, Dangou, Jianhang, Mingde, Mingxin, Zhangjing, Liren and Zhongda Village.

Education

Universities
 National Taiwan University of Sport
 National Taichung University of Science and Technology
 China Medical University

High schools
 Taichung Municipal Taichung First Senior High School
 National Taichung Second Senior High School
 Stella Matutina Girls' High School
 Shin Min High School
 Kuang-Hwa Vocational High School of Technology

Institutions
 Headquarter of Taiwan Water Corporation

Tourist attractions

 National Museum of Natural Science and Botanical Gardens
 Taichung Broadcasting Bureau
 Taichung Confucian Temple
 Taichung Martyrs' Shrine
 Taichung Mayor's House
 Taichung Park
 Wen Ying Hall
 Yuanbao Temple

Shopping
 Yizhong Street

See also
 Taichung

External links

  

Districts of Taichung